The 2011 Algarve Cup was the eighteenth edition of the Algarve Cup, an invitational women's football tournament held annually in Portugal. It took place between 2–9 March 2011.

Format
The twelve invited teams were split into three groups that played a round-robin tournament.

Groups A and B, containing the strongest ranked teams, were the only ones in contention to win the title. The group winners from A and B contested the final, with the runners-up playing for third place and those that finished third in these two groups playing for fifth place.

The teams in Group C were playing for places 7–12, with the winner of Group C playing the team that finished fourth in Group A or B with the better record for seventh place and the Group C runner-up playing the team which came last in Group A or B with the worse record for ninth place. The third and fourth-placed teams in Group C played for eleventh place.

Points awarded in the group stage follow the standard formula of three points for a win, one point for a draw and zero points for a loss. In the case of two teams being tied on the same number of points in a group, their head-to-head result determined the higher place.

Teams
Listed are the confirmed teams.

Group stage
All times local (WET/UTC+0)

Group A

Group B

Group C

Placement play-offs
All times local (WET/UTC+0)

11th Place

9th Place

7th Place

5th Place

3rd Place

Final

Top Goal Scorers 
 3 goals
  Alex Morgan
  Carli Lloyd
  Carla Couto
  Edite Fernandes
  Jessica Fishlock
  Margrét Lára Viðarsdóttir

Most Valuable Player 
  Homare Sawa

Fair Play

References 

Alg
Algarve Cup
2011
March 2011 sports events in Europe
2011 in Portuguese women's sport